Polyortha maculata is a species of moth of the family Tortricidae. It is found in Ecuador.

References

Moths described in 1999
Polyortha
Moths of South America
Taxa named by Józef Razowski